Archana Gautam is an Indian politician, actress, model and beauty pageant title holder, who won Miss Bikini India 2018, represented India at Miss Cosmos World 2018 and won sub title of Most Talent 2018. In 2022, she appeared in Bigg Boss 16.

Early life
Gautam was born in Meerut, Uttar Pradesh. She has a brother younger than her. She has completed her studies in Mass Communication from her town.

Career 
Gautam has been doing modelling appearances in print and television and advertising campaigns for various brands. She has made cameo appearances in films like Great Grand Masti, Haseena Parker and Baaraat Company. She had a cameo for item song in Junction Varanasi. She has also shot for a music video with director Apoorva Lakhia for T-Series.

She was awarded the title of Miss Uttar Pradesh in 2014. She has won Miss Bikini India 2018 and represented India at Miss Bikini Universe 2018. Gautam also represented India in Miss Cosmos 2018 held at Malaysia and won the sub title Most Talent 2018.

From October 2022 to February 2023, she was seen as a participant in the Colors TV's reality show Bigg Boss 16, where she finished as the 3rd runner-up.

Politics
She joined Indian National Congress in November 2021 and got a ticket from Hastinapur (Assembly constituency) for 2022 Uttar Pradesh Legislative Assembly election. She was among the 8 candidates from this constituency. She lost the seat to BJP candidate Dinesh Khatik who won 107587 votes, while Gautam received only 1,519 votes.

Filmography

Films

Television

Music videos

Pageants

References

External links 

 

Living people
Actresses in Hindi cinema
Beauty pageant contestants from India
21st-century Indian actresses
Actresses in Tamil cinema
Actresses from Uttar Pradesh
People from Meerut
Politicians from Meerut
Year of birth missing (living people)